Od bižuterije do ćilibara (trans. From Bijouterie to Amber) is the sixth studio album from Serbian and former Yugoslav rock band Bajaga i Instruktori, released in 1997.

Track listing
All songs written by Momčilo Bajagić, except where noted.
"Silikon (2004.)" – 3:40
"Tvoja je gajba sigurna" – 5:11
"Još te volim" – 4:42
"To!" – 3:51
"Iza nas..." - 4:35
"Leti leti ptico" – 4:37
"Nezgodna varijanta (Jedna od...)" – 5:19
"Ne volim zimu" (Ž. Milenković, M Bajagić) – 2:38
"Što ne može niko možeš ti" – 5:08

Personnel
Momčilo Bajagić - vocals, guitar
Žika Milenković - vocals, guitar
Miroslav Cvetković - bass guitar, backing vocals
Saša Lokner - keyboards, backing vocals
Vlada Negovanović - guitar, backing vocals
Čeda Macura - drums, backing vocals

Additional personnel
Saša Habić - cello
Boško Milaković - drum programming

Reception
The songs "Silikon (2004.)", "Tvoja je gajba sigurna", "Ne volim zimu", and the ballads "Još te volim" and "Iza nas" were the album's biggest hits.

References 
Od bižuterije do ćilibara at Discogs
 EX YU ROCK enciklopedija 1960-2006,  Janjatović Petar;

External links 
Od bižuterije do ćilibara at Discogs

Bajaga i Instruktori albums
1997 albums
Komuna (company) albums